The 27th (N Rhodesia) Infantry Brigade was a brigade sized formation of the British Army, which was founded on 18 September 1940 in Northern Rhodesia. The brigade was initially called the 7th (N Rhodesia) Infantry Brigade, but was redesignated on 3 October 1940 as the 27th (N Rhodesia) Infantry Brigade. In April 1945, the brigade was redesignated to the 27th (East Africa) Infantry Brigade.

The brigade was composed of units, initially, from the Northern Rhodesia Regiment. The brigade later included units from the King's African Rifles and the Mauritius Regiment. During the Second World War, the brigade formed part of various corps-sized commands, and was deployed to East Africa and the Union of South Africa in a non-combat role. The brigade also took part in the Battle of Madagascar.

General officers commanding
The brigade had the following commanders, during the Second World War.

Order of battle
The brigade was composed of the following units:

 2nd Battalion, Northern Rhodesia Regiment (NRR)
 3rd Battalion, NRR (until 20 July 1943)
 4th Battalion, NRR (from 26 November 1940 until 26 February 1943)
 2/3rd Battalion, King's African Rifles (KAR; from 26 February 1943 until 31 May 1943)
 3rd Battalion (Kenya), KAR (from 1 June 1945)
 6th Battalion (Tanganyika Territory), KAR (from 21 July 1943)
 1st Battalion, Mauritius Regiment (from 20 December 1943 until 28 June 1944)
 21st Battalion (Nyasaland), KAR (from 1 December 1944)
 27th (Northern Rhodesia) Infantry Brigade Group Company, East Africa Army Service Corps (remained with the brigade after it ceased being a brigade group)
 4th Infantry Brigade Workshop, East Africa Army Electrical Mechanical Engineers (remained with the brigade after it ceased being a brigade group)

Between April 1942 and April 1945, the brigade operated as a brigade group and commanded the following units:
 4th East Africa Armoured Car Regiment (from 15 November 1944)
 55th (Tanganyika) Light Battery, East African Artillery (until 23 November 1942)
 57th (East Africa) Field Battery, East African Artillery (from 19 December 1942, until 26 December 1942)
 59th (East Africa) Field Company, East African Engineers (until 7 June 1943)
 31st (Nyasaland) Independent Machine Gun Company, KAR (from 24 July 1944 until 31 October 1944)
 31st Battalion (Nyasaland), KAR (from 20 November 1944)
 41st Battalion (Nyasaland), KAR (from 20 November 1944)
 27th (Northern Rhodesia) Infantry Brigade Group Company, East Africa Army Service Corps (until 23 July 1944)
 7th (Northern Rhodesia) Field Ambulance, Royal Medical Corps
 4th Infantry Brigade Workshop, East Africa Army Electrical Mechanical Engineers (from 16 September 1944)

Notes
 Footnotes

 Citations

References
 

Infantry brigades of the British Army in World War II
Military units and formations of Northern Rhodesia in World War II
1940s establishments in Northern Rhodesia
Military units and formations established in 1940